Kenneth Carter (September 9, 1933 – January 7, 2017) was an American politician. A member of the Democratic Party, he served in the Rhode Island House of Representatives, representing the 31st District from 1993 to 2011. Carter died on January 7, 2017, in Saunderstown, Rhode Island.

Birth
Kenneth Carter was born in Scottsboro, Alabama on September 9, 1933.

Family
Carter was married to Sylvia Clark and together they had four children named Kenneth, Michael, Mitchell, and Matthew.

Personal life and community involvement
Carter served in the U.S. Navy during the Korean War and owned several restaurants in Narragansett.  He owned and operated Carter's 19th Hole, a bar/restaurant located at the North Kingstown Golf Course on Quonset Point.  He also ran the Shriner's Hall in North Kingstown.

Education
Carter graduated from Jackson County High School in Alabama, where he served as Class President.

Politics
Kenneth Carter represented District 31 in the Rhode Island House of Representatives from 1993 until 2011. He lost reelection on November 2, 2010, to Republican challenger Doreen Costa, by a margin of 54.2 percent to 45.8 percent. This election coincided with a Republican wave nationally.

Carter was remembered by colleagues, including Costa, for his fairness and civility.

During the 2009-2010 sessions, he served on the House Committee on Finance, and served as Chairman of the House Committee on Veterans Affairs.

Political experience
Carter has had the following political experience:
Candidate, Rhode Island House of Representatives, District 31, 2010
Representative, Rhode Island State House of Representatives, 1992-2010
Delegate, Rhode Island Constitutional Convention, 1986

Caucuses/Non-Legislative Committees
Carter has been a member of the following committees:
Crime Lab Commission
Board of Governors, Higher Education
North Kingstown Democratic Town Committee
Selective Service Commission

References

External links
Rhode Island House - Representative Kenneth Carter official RI House website

Democratic Party members of the Rhode Island House of Representatives
People from Scottsboro, Alabama
1933 births
People from North Kingstown, Rhode Island
2017 deaths
People from Washington County, Rhode Island